This is a list of the main career statistics of professional Czech tennis player Barbora Krejčíková. She is known for good results and titles in all three events: singles, doubles and mixed doubles. Until 2021, she been known mostly for her great results in doubles and mixed doubles. Her big progress in singles came during the season of 2021, when among many good results, she won her first Women's Tennis Association (WTA) singles title, first Grand Slam singles title and also being ranked as No. 3. The following year, she even had chance to be world No. 1 after Australian Open but she missed that opportunity. A month later, she climbed to place No. 2 as her career-highest. At the 2023 Dubai Championships, she won her first WTA 1000 title and in that way collected at least one title from all categories in either singles or doubles - only missing Year-end championships title in singles. There she also made wins against three highest ranked players on the WTA Ranking, becaming one of the few players that done so.

Despite focusing more in singles, Krejčíková continued to make significant results in doubles as well. After winning French Open and Wimbledon in doubles events in 2018, she became No. 1 doubles player. At the 2020 Tokyo Summer Olympics, postponed in 2021 due to COVID-19, she has won Gold medal in doubles event. In 2021, she also won WTA Finals. All mentioned doubles achievements she made alongside countrymate Kateřina Siniaková.

Krejčíková has won titles of the all tiers. At the Grand Slams, she has total of 11 titles: 1 in singles, 7 in doubles and 3 in mixed doubles. She completed her "Career Grand Slam" in doubles by winning the 2022 US Open alongside Siniaková. By winning this title, she did not only collected all grand slams but also achieved "Career Golden Slam" and "Career Super Slam" at the same time. Achieving this alongside Siniaková, they became the second women's pair (and the third and fourth women overall, after Gigi Fernández and Pam Shriver) to complete this goal.

Performance timelines

Only main-draw results in WTA Tour, Grand Slam tournaments, Fed Cup/Billie Jean King Cup and Olympic Games are included in win–loss records.

Singles
Current after the 2023 BNP Paribas Open.

Doubles
Current after the 2023 Indian Wells Masters.

Mixed doubles

Grand Slam finals

Singles: 1 (1 title)

Doubles: 8 (7 titles, 1 runner-ups)

Mixed doubles: 3 (3 titles)

Other significant finals

Olympic finals

Doubles: 1 (1 Gold Medal)

Year-end championships finals

Doubles: 3 (1 title, 2 runner-ups)

WTA 1000 finals

Singles: 2 (1 title, 1 runner-up)

Doubles: 5 (3 titles, 2 runner-ups)

WTA Tour career finals

Singles: 9 (6 titles, 3 runner-ups)

Doubles: 26 (16 titles, 10 runner-ups)

Note: Tournaments sourced from official WTA archives

WTA Challenger finals

Doubles: 1 (1 title)

Note: Tournaments sourced from official WTA archives

ITF Circuit finals

Singles: 21 (14 titles, 7 runner–ups)

Doubles: 26 (19 titles, 7 runner–ups)

Note: Tournaments sourced from official ITF archives

Junior finals

Junior Grand Slam finals

Girls' doubles: 4 (3 titles, 1 runner–up)

ITF Finals

Singles: 11 (7 titles, 4 runner–ups)

Doubles: 26 (16 titles, 10 runner–ups) 

Note: Tournaments sourced from official Junior ITF archives

Fed Cup/Billie Jean King Cup participation

Singles: 2 (0–2)

Doubles: 2 (1–1)

WTA ranking 
Current after the 2022 season.

WTA Tour career earnings
Current after the 2022 season.
{|cellpadding=3 cellspacing=0 border=1 style=border:#aaa;solid:1px;border-collapse:collapse;text-align:center;
|-style=background:#eee;font-weight:bold
|width="90"|Year
|width="100"|Grand Slam <br/ >titles|width="100"|WTA <br/ >titles
|width="100"|Total <br/ >titles
|width="120"|Earnings ($)
|width="100"|Money list rank
|-
|2014
|0
|0
|0
|align="right"|43,148
|242
|-
|2015
|0
|1
|1
|align="right"|79,108
|200
|-
|2016
|0
|0
|0
|align="right"|199,202
|134
|-
|2017
|0
|0
|0
|align="right"|181,639
|154
|-
|2018
|2
|0
|2
|align="right"|1,183,541
|33
|-
|2019
|1
|2
|3
|align="right"|654,774
|60
|-
|2020
|1
|1
|2
|align="right" |591,712
|28
|-
|2021
|3
|6
|9
|align="right" |3,646,883
|bgcolor="thistle" |2
|-
|2022
|3
|2
|5
|align=right|2,136,942
|11
|-
|2023
|1
|1
|2
|align=right|0
|n/a
|-style="font-weight:bold;"
|Career
|11
|13
|24
|align="right"|8,754,074
|73
|}

 Career Grand Slam statistics 

Grand Slam tournament seedings
The tournaments won by Krejčíková are in boldface, and advanced into finals by Krejčíková are in italics.

 Singles 

 Doubles 

 Mixed doubles 

 Best Grand Slam results details 
Grand Slam winners are in boldface, and runner–ups are in italics.

 Singles 

 Record against other players 

 Record against top 10 players 
Krejčíková's record against players who have been ranked in the top 10. Active players are in boldface.

 Record against No. 11–20 players 
Krejčíková's record against players who have been ranked world No. 11–20. Active players are in boldface:

  Beatriz Haddad Maia 2–0
  Alison Riske 2–0
  Elena Rybakina 2–0
  Anastasija Sevastova 1–0
  Mihaela Buzărnescu 1–0
  Varvara Lepchenko 1–0
  Anastasia Pavlyuchenkova 1–0
  Kaia Kanepi 1–0
  Leylah Fernandez 1–0
  Barbora Strýcová 2–1
  Karolína Muchová 2–1
  Sabine Lisicki 1–1
  Ekaterina Alexandrova 2–3
  Virginie Razzano 0–1
  Kirsten Flipkens 0–1
  Jennifer Brady' 0–1

 No. 1 wins 

Top 10 wins

 Singles 

 Krejčíková has an 11–13 record against players who were, at the time the match was played, ranked in the top 10.

 Doubles Players that were in the top 10 in that moment are in boldface.''

Longest winning streaks

15-match singles winning streak (2021)

Awards

WTA Awards 
 Doubles Team of the year: 2018, 2021 and 2022 (alongside Kateřina Siniaková)
Most improved player of the year: 2021

See also 

 Krejčíková–Siniaková doubles team

Notes

References

Krejčíková, Barbora